Alexander Wilding Weed (born May 11, 1980) is an American actor.  He is perhaps best known for his guest-starring roles in several TV shows, including Criminal Minds, Pretty Little Liars, Gilmore Girls, House, and "House Hunters Renovations".

Life and career

Weed has guest-starred on several TV shows.  For instance, he played serial killer Travis James in episode 7.07 of Criminal Minds, titled "There's No Place Like Home". He also played the role of Luke on the web comedy series Suck and Moan, which relates the story of a zombie apocalypse through the perspective of a vampire community.

He is married to Fiona Gubelmann, with whom he costarred in the 2005 film Horror  High.

Filmography

References

External links

1980 births
Living people
American male television actors